"Put It on Ya" is a song performed by American hip hop artist; Plies. The song features newcoming R&B artist Chris J, and is produced by No I.D., and was co-written by Kon Live recording duo, Rock City (group) . It is the first official single from Plies' third studio album Da REAList.

Background
The promo version of "Put It on Ya" was released to the Internet on October 7, 2008. The album version was premiered with the video via his MySpace page over a month prior on November 12, 2008. The video was also featured on BET's Access Granted. After the album's release the song entered the iTunes top 100 at #29.

Chart performance
"Put It On Ya" debuted at #92 on the Billboard Hot 100 and had been rising up the chart each week. On the issue of January 3, 2009, it rose from #65 to #31, after the album Da REAList was released.

Charts

Weekly charts

Year-end charts

References

External links
 "Put It On Ya" music video on MTV.com

2008 singles
Plies (rapper) songs
Song recordings produced by No I.D.
Songs written by Plies (rapper)
Songs written by No I.D.
Songs written by Theron Thomas
Songs written by Timothy Thomas
2008 songs